The Wanderers is a 1931 novel by Vyacheslav Shishkov, telling the story of the two homeless boys in the Soviet Union of the 1920s.  

Part one of the novel, Filka and Amelka was first published in 1930 by Krasnaya Nov (issues 4-6), originally as a finished novella. Complete with parts two and three, "The Darkness Gives Way" (Мрак дрогнул) and "Labour" (Труд), respectively, the novel came out as a separate edition in 1931 via the Leningrad Writers' Publishers. 

Shishkov started working on The Wanderers in 1928, inspired by a letter he'd received from a young man from Simferopol, telling him about his life as a teenage tramp. What was supposed to be a short story has grown up into first a novella and then a novel. One of its working titles was Free Birds' Way (Путь вольных птиц). Shishkov did a lot of research and spent himself a long time on the road, meeting groups and communities of homeless people all over the country. 

In an April 1930 letter he wrote: "Today is my first day at the writing desk after a week spent with flu. Caught it during my two-day inspection of a prison in Leningrad. Am going to continue this inspection, when I get better. I need this for the second part of my novella Free Birds' Way."  

Upon its release the novel received a warm welcome. "A large, 500-pages book of mine has just come out. Everybody seems to like it, both the men of letters and general readership," Shishkov informed V.P. Petrov by a letter, on 25 September 1931.

References

External links
 Странники at modernlib.net. The original Russian text

1931 Russian novels
Soviet novels
Novels set in 20th-century Russia